Corella willmeriana is a solitary tunicate in the family Corellidae.

Description
Solitary, sessile tunicate.  Incurrent and excurrent siphons directed upwards, away from substratum.  Without dorsal nerve cord as adult.

Identification
Solitary ascidians (not reproducing by budding), but not embedded in a common tunic.  Individual is usually more than 1 cm in diameter.  Tunic transparent or translucent.  Attached to a firm substratum.  Body is taller than wide.  Oral and atrial siphons about the same length.  Tunic smooth or irregularly wrinkled.  Body not much taller than wide; tunic transparent and colorless; longitudinal muscle bands not obvious beneath the tunic; oral and atrial apertures not borne on distinct siphons.  Rectum more than three-fourths the height of the body; atrium not expanded into a pocket in which embryos are brooded.

Reproduction and development
Hermaphroditic; Corella willmeriana breeds throughout the year.  The eggs are fertilized in the atrial chamber, where they develop into the free-swimming tadpole stage before released.  Swimming larvae remain juveniles for <2 days before anterior adhesive organs allow for attachment to substratum.  This triggers metamorphism, which entails enlargement of pharynx for filter feeding; the notochord is sucked back into body and is no longer present in adult form.

Predation and other threats
Eurylepta leoparda, a cotylean polyclad flatworm, rolls up into a tube and enters C. willmeriana through the oral aperture. It unrolls itself and ingests the branchial basket. It then either leaves the individual through a siphon or continues to feed on the remainder of the internal organs. Other flatworms and polychaetes have been found to eat C. willmeriana. Very young C. willmeriana are frequently overgrown during the winter by colonial ascidian Diplosoma madconaldi. Diatom blooms in springtime sometimes smother adult C. willmeriana.

Range and ecology
Pacific Ocean from southern Alaska to southern California. Subtidal to 75 m. Often found in fouling communities. It is a primary colonizer, as the tadpoles have demonstrated preference to settle on clean, unfouled surfaces.

Synonyms
Transparent tunicate, transparent sea squirt, solitary tunicate.

Literature cited

Kozloff, Eugene N.  Marine Invertebrates of the Pacific Northwest.  Seattle WA: University of Washington Press, 1987, 1996.

Lamb, Andy & Hanby, Bernard P.  Marine Life of the Pacific Northwest.  Madeira Park, B.C.: Harbour Publishing, 2005.

Lambert, Gretchen.  “The General Ecology and Growth of a Solitary Ascidian, Corella willmeriana”.  Seattle, WA: University of Washington Zoology Department, from a thesis submitted in partial fulfillment of the requirements for the M.S. degree, 1967.

External links
Link back to IZE Species Pages

Enterogona
Animals described in 1898
Taxa named by William Abbott Herdman